Neocalyptis nematodes is a species of moth of the  family Tortricidae. It is found on Luzon in the Philippines and on Sebesi and Java in Indonesia.

References

	

Moths described in 1928
Neocalyptis